Phủ Lý station is one of the main railway stations on the North–South railway (Reunification Express) in Vietnam. It serves the city of Phủ Lý.

Railway stations in Vietnam
Buildings and structures in Hà Nam province